Papilio amynthor, the Norfolk swallowtail, is a species of butterfly in the family Papilionidae, that is found in the south-west Pacific Ocean on Norfolk Island and the Loyalty Islands. It commonly inhabits rainforest and suburban areas.

The wingspan is 85–91 mm.

The larvae feed on the leaves of Zanthoxylum pinnatum, and the introduced Citrus limon.

References

External links

Butterfly Corner

amynthor
Butterflies described in 1859